Barauna is a village in Shahganj tehsil of Jaunpur District in Uttar Pradesh, India. Most of the residents are farmers.

The village has a government primary school, as well as a senior secondary school.

References 

Villages in Jaunpur district